45 Aurigae or PLX 1468.2 is a binary star system in the northern constellation of Auriga. It has an apparent visual magnitude of 5.34, making it visible to the naked eye under suitable viewing conditions. An annual parallax shift of 16.89 mas as seen from Earth's orbit indicates the system is located about 193 light years from the Sun.

This is a close, single-lined spectroscopic binary with a circularized orbit with a short period of 6.5 days. They have a mean angular separation of 0.963 mas. The visible component has a stellar classification of F5 V, matching an F-type main-sequence star that is generating energy through hydrogen fusion at it core. It is about 1.6 billion years old and is spinning with a projected rotational velocity of 14 K. It has 1.2 times the mass of the Sun and is radiating 22 times the Sun's luminosity from its photosphere at an effective temperature of around 6,489 K. The secondary has a minimum mass of 42% of the Sun's mass.

References

External links
 HR 2264
 Image 45 Aurigae

F-type main-sequence stars
Spectroscopic binaries
Auriga (constellation)
Durchmusterung objects
Aurigae, 45
043905
030247
2264